The Gazette des Beaux-Arts was a French art review, founded in 1859 by Édouard Houssaye, with Charles Blanc as its first chief editor. Assia Visson Rubinstein was chief editorial secretary under the direction of George Wildenstein from 1936 until 1960. Her papers, which include all editions of the Gazette from this period, are intact at the Cantonal and University Library of Lausanne in Dorigny. The Gazette was a world reference work on art history for nearly 100 years - one other editor in chief, from 1955 to 1987, was Jean Adhémar. It was bought in 1928 by the Wildenstein family, whose last representative was Daniel Wildenstein, its director from 1963 until his death in 2001. The magazine was published monthly and was headquartered in Paris. The review closed in 2002.

List of directors 
1859-1863: Édouard Houssaye
1863-1872: Émile Galichon
1872-1875: Maurice Cottier, Édouard André and Ernest Hoschedé
1875-1882: Maurice Cottier, Édouard André
1882-1897: Mme Cottier, M. and Mme Édouard André. Charles Ephrussi associated from 1885
1900-1905: Roger Marx and Charles Ephrussi
1905-1928: Théodore Reinach
1928-1963: Georges Wildenstein
1963-2001: Daniel Wildenstein
2001-2002: Guy Wildenstein

References

External links
 Issues from 1859 to 1948 on Gallica, periodicals section of the BnF.

1859 establishments in France
2002 disestablishments in France
Defunct magazines published in France
French-language magazines
Monthly magazines published in France
Magazines established in 1859
Magazines disestablished in 2002
Magazines published in Paris
French art publications